Kei Nishikori was the defending champion, but chose to compete in Madrid instead.
Wayne Odesnik defeated Donald Young 6–4, 6–4 in the final.

Seeds

Draw

Finals

Top half

Bottom half

References
Main draw
Qualifying singles

2011 ATP Challenger Tour
2011 Singles